Mangalam Dam is a village in the Palakkad district in the state of Kerala, India. It is administered by Vandazhy gram panchayat. This village is named after the dam of the same name situated in the region.

Demographics 
 census if India, the village had a population of 6,008, comprising 2,978 males and 3,030 females.

See also 
 Mangalam Dam

References

Mangalam Dam, Kerala